James Cowlishaw (19 December 1834 – 25 July 1929) was an architect, businessman and politician in Queensland (initially a colony, then a state of Australia from 1901).

Early life

Cowlishaw was born in Sydney, where he was educated at St. James's Grammar School, and went to Queensland in 1861 to practise as an architect.

Politics
On 18 April 1878 he was appointed to a seat in the Queensland Legislative Council and held it until the Council was abolished in March 1922.

Business
Cowlishaw was part proprietor and managing director for some years of the Brisbane Evening Telegraph, but sold his interest in the newspaper in 1885.

Cowlishaw founded the Brisbane Gas Company in 1864, was auditor from 1869 to 1873 and then became a director. He then succeeded Lewis Bernays as chairman in March 1879, and held that position until 1920.

Later life
Cowlishaw died in Bowen Hills, Brisbane, Queensland and was buried in Toowong Cemetery.

Works
His architectural works include:
 Fortitude Valley Methodist Church (1870)
 Hanworth, East Brisbane
 Oakwal
 Wilston House

References

Architects from Brisbane
1834 births
1929 deaths
Members of the Queensland Legislative Council
Burials at Toowong Cemetery
Australian businesspeople